Events from the year 2017 in Cambodia

Incumbents
 Monarch: Norodom Sihamoni
 Prime Minister: Hun Sen

Events

Deaths

15 March – Sok An, politician (b. 1950).

References

 
Years of the 21st century in Cambodia
Cambodia
Cambodia
2010s in Cambodia